It Must Be Him may refer to:
 It Must Be Him (Vikki Carr album), 1967
It Must Be Him (Ray Conniff album), 1967
 "It Must Be Him" (song), a 1967 popular song with music written by Gilbert Bécaud
 It Must Be Him (musical), a 2010 off-Broadway musical with music by Larry Grossman